The Intense Bowl was the championship game for the Intense Football League (IFL).

Number of appearances:
Corpus Christi Hammerheads: 3 (0-3)
Louisiana Swashbucklers: 2 (2-0)
Amarillo Dusters: 1 (1-0)
Odessa Roughnecks: 1 (1-0)
Lubbock Renegades: 1 (0-1)

Intense Football League
Indoor American football competitions